Chara Airport (also Chara Kyust-Kemda Airport)  is an airport in Russia located 2 km northeast of the rural locality of Chara. It has a wide paved runway and parking apron. It is a civilian airport.

Airlines and destinations

References
RussianAirFields.com

Airports built in the Soviet Union
Airports in Zabaykalsky Krai